Theruvu Narthaki is a 1988 Indian Malayalam film,  directed by N. Sankaran Nair and produced by S. Kumar. The film stars Balan K. Nair, Bheeman Raghu, Geetha and Anuradha in the lead roles. The film has musical score by Vijayabhaskar.

Cast
Balan K. Nair
Bheeman Raghu
Geetha
Anuradha
Vincent

Soundtrack
The music was composed by Vijayabhaskar.

References

External links
 

1988 films
1980s Malayalam-language films
Films directed by N. Sankaran Nair